Guaranobunus guaraniticus is a species of harvestmen in a monotypic genus in the family Sclerosomatidae from Argentina.

References

Harvestmen
Monotypic arachnid genera